Arthur Pease, DL (12 September 1837 – 27 August 1898) was a British politician, son of Joseph Pease.

Biography
He was a Liberal Member of Parliament for Whitby from 1880 to 1885, and a Liberal Unionist MP for Darlington from 1895 until his death in 1898, aged 60.

He was a member of the Royal Commission on Opium in India from 1893 to 1895.

He married on 14 April 1864 to Mary Lecky Pike. They had two sons, Sir Arthur Pease, 1st Baronet (1866–1927) and Herbert Pease, 1st Baron Daryngton (1867–1949), and one daughter Winifred Pike Pease, who married in 1903 Roger William Bulwer Jenyns, of Bottisham Hall, Cambridgeshire; they were parents of the art historian Soame Jenyns.

References

External links
 

1837 births
1898 deaths
Deputy Lieutenants of Durham
Arthur
Liberal Party (UK) MPs for English constituencies
UK MPs 1880–1885
Liberal Unionist Party MPs for English constituencies
UK MPs 1895–1900